Zambee is a settlement on the island of Saint Thomas in the United States Virgin Islands.

The local time zone is Atlantic Standard Time which has a UTC offset of -4 hours.

Location
Caribbean, islands 1,100 miles southeast of Florida, 600 miles north of Venezuela, 40 miles east of Puerto Rico; between the Caribbean Sea and the North Atlantic Ocean, bordering the Virgin Islands Trough and the Anegada Passage and roughly 100 miles south of the Puerto Rico Trench.

References

Populated places in Saint Thomas, U.S. Virgin Islands
Northside, Saint Thomas, U.S. Virgin Islands